Ungentle Exhumation is a demo tape by the technical death metal band Cryptopsy. The demo was released in 1993 and is the band's first ever release. It was re-released in 2002 as an MCD. 

Besides the track "Back to the Worms", all tracks were re-recorded for the debut album Blasphemy Made Flesh. However "Back to the Worms" was re-recorded for ...And Then You'll Beg.

Track listing

Personnel
 Lord Worm - lead vocals
 Dave Galea     - lead guitar, backing vocals
 Steve Thibault - rhythm guitar, backing vocals
 Kevin Weagle - bass
 Flo Mounier - drums, backing vocals

References

Cryptopsy albums
1993 EPs